Aldo Bergolli (1916–1972) was an Italian painter of the Corrente de Vita movement started in Milan as a counterpoint to nationalistic Futurism and the Novecento Italiano movements. He painted both expressionist figurative works, but later focused on more hieroglyphic abstract themes.

References

1916 births
1972 deaths
Brera Academy alumni
20th-century Italian painters
Italian male painters
20th-century Italian male artists